Marcel Gatuing (3 March 1894 – 29 June 1970) was a French politician.

Gatuing was born in Mostaganem, French Algeria. He represented the Popular Republican Movement (MRP) in the Constituent Assembly elected in 1945, in the Constituent Assembly elected in 1946 and in the Senate from 1946 to 1951.

References

1894 births
1970 deaths
People from Mostaganem
Pieds-Noirs
Popular Republican Movement politicians
Members of the Constituent Assembly of France (1945)
Members of the Constituent Assembly of France (1946)
French Senators of the Fourth Republic
Senators of French citizens living abroad
Migrants from French Algeria to France